Street Angels is a 1996 Hong Kong film directed by Billy Tang Hin-Shing.

Cast and roles
 Chingmy Yau - Tung Yen
 Elvis Tsui - Moro
 Linda Cheung - Pidan / Black Beauty
 Maria Cordero - Singer in Number One Club (cameo)
 Michael Tao - Brother Man
 Simon Yam - Walkie Pi
 Shu Qi - Ming-Ming
 Spencer Lam - Barrister Lam
 Valerie Chow - Karen

External links
 IMDb entry
 HK CInemagic entry
 loveHKfilm entry

1996 films
Hong Kong action comedy films
Films directed by Billy Tang
1990s Hong Kong films